Bethel Township, population 4,467, is one of fifteen townships in Bladen County, North Carolina. The Town of Dublin is within Bethel Township.

Geography
The west side of Bethel Township is drained by Black Swamp, Reedy Meadow Swamp, and Bear Ford Swamp which drain to the Lumber River.  The east side is drained by Bakers Creek, a tributary of the Cape Fear River.

References

Townships in Bladen County, North Carolina
Townships in North Carolina